CYPRIS (cryptographic RISC microprocessor) was a cryptographic processor developed by the Lockheed Martin Advanced Technology Laboratories. The device was designed to implement NSA encryption algorithms and had a similar intent to the AIM and Sierra crypto modules. However, the principal references date back to the late 1990s and it does not appear that the CYPRIS ever earned NSA's Type 1 certification, without which it could not be used to protect classified government traffic.

According to a manufacturer presentation,

References 

Cryptographic hardware